Stephen Hunter Owen (born September 22, 1993) is an American professional baseball third baseman and outfielder who is a free agent. The Pittsburgh Pirates drafted him in the 25th round of the 2016 Major League Baseball draft.

Amateur career
Owen attended Mater Dei High School and was drafted out of Indiana State University in the 25th round, 765th overall, of the 2016 Major League Baseball draft.

Professional career
Owen made his professional debut for the Low-A West Virginia Black Bears. In 2017, Owen spent the bulk of the season with the Single-A West Virginia Power, slashing .292/.388/.505 with 11 home runs and 45 RBI in 343 plate appearances. The next year, Owen spent the season with the High-A Bradenton Marauders, with a batting line of .262/.317/.464 to go along with a career-high 18 home runs and 60 RBI. In 2019, Owen split the season between the Double-A Altoona Curve and the Triple-A Indianapolis Indians, batting a cumulative .261/.345/.485 with 19 home runs and 53 RBI.

Owen did not play in a game in 2020 due to the cancellation of the Minor League Baseball season because of the COVID-19 pandemic. Owen was invited to Spring Training for the 2021 season but did not make the club and was assigned to Indianapolis to begin the year.

On May 4, 2021, Owen was selected to the 40-man roster and promoted to the major leagues for the first time. Owen made his debut the next day as the starting right fielder against the San Diego Padres. After going hitless in 5 plate appearances, Owen was designated for assignment on May 11, 2021. He was outrighted to Triple-A Indianapolis on May 15. He elected free agency on November 10, 2022.

Personal life
Owen's father Steve played first base for the Evansville Purple Aces and his older brother, Tyler, played for the Murray State Racers. Owen's high school coach was Jeff Schulz, a former major leaguer with the Kansas City Royals and Pittsburgh Pirates.

References

External links

1993 births
Living people
Sportspeople from Evansville, Indiana
Baseball players from Indiana
Major League Baseball infielders
Major League Baseball outfielders
Pittsburgh Pirates players
Indiana State Sycamores baseball players
West Virginia Black Bears players
West Virginia Power players
Gulf Coast Pirates players
Bradenton Marauders players
Altoona Curve players
Indianapolis Indians players
Greensboro Grasshoppers players